Events from the year 1636 in Spain

Incumbents
 Monarch – Philip IV

Events

 August 15 -  Spanish Siege of Corbie in France.

Births

Deaths

References

 
1630s in Spain
Years of the 17th century in Spain